"Terminal Frost" is an instrumental from Pink Floyd's 1987 album, A Momentary Lapse of Reason.

Recording
The saxophones are played by Tom Scott and John Helliwell, the latter best known for his work with Supertramp. The track is bookended by "A New Machine (Part 1)" and "A New Machine (Part 2)" which creates a mini-suite on the album. The sequence of "A New Machine (Part 1) - Terminal Frost - A New Machine (Part 2)" were the only tracks from the album which were not performed at every show of the 1987-89 tours, frequently being dropped. David Gilmour has said that "Terminal Frost" is the oldest piece on the album, having been written many years before.

Personnel
Pink Floyd
David Gilmour – electric guitar, acoustic guitar, programming

Additional musicians:

Richard Wright – piano, Kurzweil synthesiser, Hammond organ
Bob Ezrin – programming, keyboards, percussion
Jon Carin – keyboards, synthesizers
Tony Levin – bass guitar
Tom Scott – soprano saxophone
John Helliwell – saxophone
Darlene Koldenhoven (as Darlene Koldenhaven) – backing vocals
Carmen Twillie – backing vocals
Phyllis St. James – backing vocals
Donny Gerrard – backing vocals

References

1987 songs
Pink Floyd songs
Rock instrumentals
Songs written by David Gilmour
Song recordings produced by Bob Ezrin
Song recordings produced by David Gilmour